The 2003–04 Major Indoor Soccer League season was the third season for the league.  The regular season started on October 4, 2003, and ended on April 5, 2004.

League standings

Central Division

Eastern Division

Western Division

Playoffs

Scoring leaders
GP = Games Played, G = Goals, A = Assists, Pts = Points

Source:

League awards
 Most Valuable Player: Greg Howes, Milwaukee
 Defender of the Year: Genoni Martinez, Monterrey
 Rookie of the Year: Jamar Beasley, Kansas City
 Goalkeeper of the Year: Pete Pappas, Philadelphia
 Coach of the Year: Tatu, Dallas
 Championship Series MVP: Scott Hileman, Baltimore

Sources:

All-MISL Teams

Source:

All-Rookie Team

Source:

References

External links
Major Indoor Soccer League II (RSSSF)

Major Indoor Soccer League (2001–2008)
2003 in American soccer leagues
2004 in American soccer leagues
2003–04